Brachyopa tristis is an African species of hoverfly.

Distribution
Tunisia.

References

Diptera of Asia
Eristalinae
Insects described in 2001